Hye-jeong or Hye-jung is a Korean feminine given name. The meaning differs based on the hanja used to write each syllable of the name. There are 16 hanja with the reading "hye" and 75 hanja with the reading "jeong" on the South Korean government's official list of hanja which may be used in given names.

People with this name include:
Jo Hea-jung (born 1953), South Korean volleyball player
Kwag Hye-jeong (born 1975), South Korean handball player
Park Sol-mi (born Park Hye-jung, 1978), South Korean actress
Hwangbo (born Hwangbo Hye-jeong, 1980), South Korean rapper, singer and actress
Kang Hye-jung (born 1982), South Korean actress
Shin Hye-jeong (field hockey) (born 1992), South Korean field hockey player
Shin Hye-jeong (born 1993), South Korean actress and idol singer, member of AOA
Kim Hye-jeong (born 1998), South Korean badminton player

See also
List of Korean given names

References

Korean feminine given names